The 1994–95 EHF Women's Champions League was the second edition of the modern era of the 1961-founded competition for European national champions women's handball clubs, running from 7 October 1994 to 7 May 1995. Defending champion Hypo Niederösterreich defeated Podravka Koprivnica in the final to win its fourth title in a row, an overall sixth. While Lokomotiva Zagreb had reached the competition's final in 1975, Podravka became the first Croatian team to attain this representing independent Croatia as war approached its end.

1/16-finals

1/8-finals

Group stage

Group A

Group B

Final

References

Women's EHF Champions League
Ehf Women's Champions League, 1994-95
Ehf Women's Champions League, 1994-95
EHF
EHF